Lower Richland High School is a senior high school in unincorporated Richland County, South Carolina, north of, but not inside, the Hopkins town. It is a part of Richland County School District One. It is an International Baccalaureate school.

It serves the town of Eastover and Hopkins.

Notable alumni

Arts and entertainment
Teyonah Parris, actress; did not graduate, but attended from 2001 to 2003

Athletics
Ike Anderson, Olympic Greco-Roman wrestler, Class of 1975
Marcus Edmond, NFL Cornerback, Class of 2013
Jo Jo English (born 1970), NBA basketball player, top scorer in the 1999-2000 Israel Basketball League
Harold Goodwin, Offensive coordinator of the Arizona Cardinals, Class of 1992
Jonathan Goodwin, former NFL center, Class of 1997
Brandon Jamison, former NFL linebacker, Class of 2000
Ernie Jackson, former NFL defensive back
Lance Laury, former NFL linebacker, Class of 2000
David Patten, former NFL wide receiver, Class of 1992
Pokey Reese, former MLB baseball player, Class of 1991
Stanley Roberts, former NBA Center, Class of 1988
Richard Seymour, former NFL defensive end, Class of 1997

Media
Nia-Malika Henderson, political reporter for CNN, Class of 1992

References

External links
 Lower Richland High School

Public high schools in South Carolina
Schools in Richland County, South Carolina
International Baccalaureate schools in South Carolina